The Italian general election of 2006 took place on 9–10 April 2006.

In the Aosta Valley single-seat constituency Roberto Nicco (Democrats of the Left, Autonomy Liberty Democracy) was elected deputy, while incumbent senator Augusto Rollandin (Valdostan Union, Aosta Valley coalition) was defeated by Carlo Perrin (Valdostan Renewal, Autonomy Liberty Democracy).

Results

Chamber of Deputies

Source: Ministry of the Interior

Senate

Source: Ministry of the Interior

Elections in Aosta Valley
2006 elections in Italy
April 2006 events in Europe